Steps Along the Way is the spiritual autobiography of Diogenes Allen, professor emeritus at Princeton Theological Seminary.  In it, he recounts his search for the providence of God.  His journey includes reflections on the evolving role of faith in the world; an exploration of the anguished and eloquent poetry of George Herbert; a reading of the message of love, duty, and forgiveness in the stories of Joseph and his brothers and the Prodigal Son; and finally, a simple, but moving, tracing of his own regrets and joys as a person of faith.

The book was published by Church Publishing Incorporated in 2002.  

1998 books
American autobiographies
Religious autobiographies